1511 Daléra, provisional designation , is an asteroid from the inner regions of the asteroid belt, approximately 12 kilometers in diameter. It was discovered on 22 March 1939, by French astronomer Louis Boyer at the Algerian Algiers Observatory, North Africa, and named after Paul Daléra, a friend of the discoverer.

Classification and orbit 

Daléra orbits the Sun in the inner main-belt at a distance of 2.1–2.6 AU once every 3 years and 7 months (1,323 days). Its orbit has an eccentricity of 0.11 and an inclination of 4° with respect to the ecliptic.

Physical characteristics

Rotation period 

In March 2015, three rotational lightcurves of Daléra were independently obtained by Italian astronomers Maurizio Scardella, Fabio Salvaggio, and Giovanni Casalnuovo after being reported as a light-curve photometry opportunity at minorplanet.info (CALL). They gave a rotation period of 3.880 and 3.881 hours with a brightness variation of 0.18 and 0.14 magnitude, respectively. Previously, photometric observations at the Palomar Transient Factory in September 2013, gave a longer period of 4.2227 hours and an amplitude of 0.14 magnitude.

Diameter and albedo 

According to the surveys carried out by NASA's Wide-field Infrared Survey Explorer with its subsequent NEOWISE mission, Daléra measures between 11.36 and 18.23 kilometers in diameter, and its surface has an albedo between 0.03 and 0.10.

The Collaborative Asteroid Lightcurve Link assumes a standard albedo for S-type asteroids of 0.20 and calculates a diameter of 7.15 kilometers based on an absolute magnitude of 13.09. However, based on the low albedos (0.03, 0.08, 0.10) determined by WISE/NEOWISE, Daléra is not a stony but rather a carbonaceous asteroid, which are uncommon in the inner main-belt.

Naming 

This minor planet was named after Paul Daléra, a friend of the discovering astronomer Louis Boyer. The official naming citation was first mentioned in The Names of the Minor Planets by Paul Herget in 1955

References

External links 
 Asteroid Lightcurve Database (LCDB), query form (info )
 Dictionary of Minor Planet Names, Google books
 Asteroids and comets rotation curves, CdR – Observatoire de Genève, Raoul Behrend
 Discovery Circumstances: Numbered Minor Planets (1)-(5000) – Minor Planet Center
 
 

001511
Discoveries by Louis Boyer (astronomer)
Named minor planets
19390322